Waterfall Seaplane Base  is a public-use seaplane base located in Waterfall on Prince of Wales Island in the Prince of Wales-Hyder Census Area of the U.S. state of Alaska. It is owned by the Waterfall Cannery Resort.

As per Federal Aviation Administration records, Waterfall SPB had 2,072 passenger boardings (enplanements) in calendar year 2008, a decrease of 7% from the 2,237 enplanements in 2007.

Facilities and aircraft 
Waterfall Seaplane Base has one seaplane landing area designated NW/SE, which measures 10,000 by 1,000 feet (3,048 x 305 m). It is unattended and the dock is removed in winter months (October through March). For the 12-month period ending December 31, 2006, it had 1,600 aircraft operations, an average of 133 per month: 94% air taxi and 6% general aviation.

References

External links 
 FAA Alaska airport diagram (GIF)

 Waterfall Resort

Airports in the Prince of Wales–Hyder Census Area, Alaska
Seaplane bases in Alaska